The Hang Li Poh's Well, also known as King's Well, is a historical water well in Melaka City, Melaka, Malaysia. It is the oldest water well in Malaysia.

History
The well was built in 1459 by the followers of Hang Li Poh as the main water source in the town. After conquering Malacca in 1511, the Portuguese secured the well and used it as their main water source supply. After conquering Malacca in 1677, the Dutch surrounded the well with solid brick walls to protect the well. However, during the British period, they neglected the well and let it fall into disrepair.

Function
Nowadays the water from the well is not that clean. It has also become a wishing well for visitors.

See also
 List of tourist attractions in Malacca
 Bukit Cina

References

1459 establishments
Buildings and structures in Malacca City
Water wells in Melaka